A French twist is a common "updo" hair styling technique. It is created by gathering the hair in one hand and twisting the hair upwards until it turns in on itself against the head. It is then secured with barrettes, combs, hair sticks and/or hairpins. It was popular from the late 1950s through the early 1970s.

French twists are usually worn to proms and weddings. Hair clips are also commonly used with French twists.

See also
 List of hairstyles

References

External links
 

1960s fashion
Scalp hairstyles